104 (one hundred [and] four) is the natural number following 103 and preceding 105.

In mathematics 
104 is a primitive semiperfect number and a composite number, with its divisors being 1, 2, 4, 8, 13, 26, 52 and 104. As it has 8 divisors total, and 8 is one of those divisors, 104 is a refactorable number. The distinct prime factors of 104 add up to 15, and so do the ones of 105, hence the two numbers form a Ruth-Aaron pair under the first definition.

In regular geometry, 104 is the smallest number of unit line segments that can exist in a plane with four of them touching at every vertex.

A figure made up of a row of 4 adjacent congruent rectangles is divided into 104 regions upon drawing diagonals of all possible rectangles.

φ(104) = φ(σ(104)).

In science
The atomic number of rutherfordium.
Number of degrees Fahrenheit corresponding to 40 Celsius.

In other fields
104 is also:
The number of Corinthian columns in the Temple of Olympian Zeus, the largest temple ever built in Greece.
The number of guns on Admiral Horatio Nelson's flagship HMS Victory.
The number of keys on a standard Windows keyboard.
The number of Symphonies written by Joseph Haydn upon which numbers are agreed (though in fact, he wrote more: see list of symphonies by Joseph Haydn).
Cent Quatre, an arts centre in Paris.

See also
 List of highways numbered 104
 UFC 104

References

 Wells, D. The Penguin Dictionary of Curious and Interesting Numbers London: Penguin Group. (1987): 133

Integers